Pittosporum dallii is a species of plant in the Pittosporaceae family. It is endemic to New Zealand.

References

Flora of New Zealand
dallii
Vulnerable plants
Taxonomy articles created by Polbot
Taxa named by Thomas Frederic Cheeseman